Oscar Luis González (born January 10, 1998) is a Dominican professional baseball outfielder for the Cleveland Guardians of Major League Baseball (MLB). He made his MLB debut in 2022.

Professional career

Minor Leagues 
González signed as an international free agent with the Cleveland Indians on July 2, 2014, for a $300,000 signing bonus. He played for the DSL Indians in 2015, hitting .203/.266/.324/.590 with 4 home runs and 38 runs batted in. 

González split the 2016 season between the AZL Indians and the Mahoning Valley Scrappers, hitting a combined .297/.340/.554/.894 with 8 home runs and 26 runs batted in. He was named the 2016 Arizona League most valuable player. He spent the 2017 season with Mahoning Valley, hitting .283/.301/.388/.689 with 3 home runs and 34 runs batted in. 

González spent the 2018 season with the Lake County Captains, hitting .292/.310/.435/.745 with 13 home runs and 52 runs batted in. He split the 2019 season between the Lynchburg Hillcats and the Akron RubberDucks, hitting a combined .293/.315/.418/.733 with 9 home runs and 70 runs batted in.  He did not play a minor league game in 2020 due to the cancellation of the minor league season caused by the COVID-19 pandemic.

González elected free agency on November 7, 2021, and re-signed with the Indians to a minor league contract the same day.

Major Leagues 
The Guardians selected González's contract on May 26, 2022.  He made his major league debut that same day, starting in right field versus the Detroit Tigers at Comerica Park.  He singled on a line drive to center field off starting pitcher Tarik Skubal in the top of the second his for the first hit.  In the ninth inning, he hit his first major league double.  On June 10, 2022, versus the Oakland Athletics, González achieved his first major league four-hit game. González became the Guardians' starting right fielder by the end of the regular season. His walk-up song is the SpongeBob SquarePants theme song, chosen because "deep inside I feel like a kid".

On October 8, 2022, González hit a walk-off home run in the bottom of the 15th inning to eliminate the Tampa Bay Rays from the 2022 American League Wild Card Series and send the Guardians to the American League Division Series against the New York Yankees. In the bottom of the 9th inning of Game 3 of the ALDS, with the bases loaded and two outs, González hit a walk-off single to give the Guardians a 2-1 series lead. The Guardians would go on to lose the series in 5 games. During the 2022 Playoffs, Gonzalez hit .226 with 4 runs batted in and 1 home run.

See also

 List of Major League Baseball players from the Dominican Republic

References

External links

1998 births
Living people
Akron RubberDucks players
Arizona League Indians players
Cleveland Guardians players
Columbus Clippers players
Dominican Republic expatriate baseball players in the United States
Dominican Summer League Indians players
Estrellas Orientales players
Lake County Captains players
Lynchburg Hillcats players
Mahoning Valley Scrappers players
Major League Baseball outfielders
Major League Baseball players from the Dominican Republic
People from San Cristóbal Province